"The Unquiet Grave" is an English folk song in which a young man's grief over the death of his true love is so deep that it disturbs her eternal sleep. It was collected in 1868 by Francis James Child as Child Ballad number 78. One of the more common tunes used for the ballad is the same as that used for the English ballad "Dives and Lazarus" and the Irish pub favorite "Star of the County Down".

Synopsis
A man mourns his true love for "a twelve month and a day". At the end of that time, the dead woman complains that his weeping is keeping her from peaceful rest. He begs a kiss. She tells him it would kill him. When he persists, wanting to join her in death, she explains that once they are both dead their hearts will simply decay, so he should enjoy life while he has it.

Variants
The version noted by Cecil Sharp ends with "When will we meet again? / When the autumn leaves that fall from the trees / Are green and spring up again."

Many verses in this ballad have parallels in other ballads: Bonny Bee Hom, Sweet William's Ghost and some variants of The Twa Brothers.

Ween plays a version featuring a woman weeping for a dead man, on their 1997 album The Mollusk entitled "Cold Blows the Wind". The liner notes of the album jokingly describe the song as a traditional Chinese spiritual.

Return of the dead
The motif that excessive grief can disturb the dead is found also in German and Scandinavian ballads, as well as Greek and Roman traditions.

In 1941 the "Journal of the English Folk Dance and Song Society" Vol 4 no 2 included a long essay by Ruth Harvey. She compares motifs from "The Unquiet Grave" with other European ballads, including "Es ging ein Knab spazieren (Der tote Freier)" from Germany. and "Faestemanden I Graven" from Denmark. She writes: "It is only inevitable that a song which certainly goes back to pre-Christian traditions should have suffered modification during the centuries.".

The Danish ballad "Faestemanden I Graven" was made into a short film "Aage og Else" (1983). In the Wikipedia article Danmarks gamle Folkeviser this Danish ballad is listed a number 90, with "Sweet William's Ghost" as the English equivalent song.

The fact that both those European ballads were printed in the seventeenth century means that it is not too much of a stretch to say that "The Unquiet Grave" is in the same time-scale. On the Fresno State University website, Robert B Waltz compares "The Unquiet Grave" with an older carol, "There blows a cold wind today" in the Bodleian Library MS 7683 (dated c 1500), and writes: "I must say that I find this a stretch; the similarities are slight indeed."

To lean on the cautious side we can allow "The Unquiet Grave" to be seventeen century, but discredit a date before 1600.

Recordings
 The composer Ralph Vaughan Williams wrote several arrangements for "How Cold the Wind doth Blow (or The Unquiet Grave)". The best known, from 1912, is for piano, violin and voice. It was recorded in 1976 by Sir Philip Ledger, Hugh Bean and Robert Tear. Catalogue  It also appears on the 1989 recording Songs of Britten and Vaughan Williams by Canadian baritone Kevin McMillan.
 Kate Rusby, Rebsie Fairholm, Carol Noonan, Joan Baez, the Dubliners, Solas, Barbara Dickson, Shirley Collins, Circulus, David Pajo, Fire + Ice and Sarah Calderwood have recorded versions of this song.
 A single-movement viola concerto by Australian composer Andrew Ford used the melody of the ballad as its foundation. Written in 1997, the concerto is pieced together from melodic fragments of the ballad and it is only in the final few minutes that the full theme emerges.
 The Pennsylvania-based alternative rock band, Ween, recorded a version of the song (retitled "Cold Blows the Wind") on their 1997 album, The Mollusk.
 The gothic/darkwave band Faith and the Muse recorded a version on their debut Elyria in 1994.
 It was recorded and released as a duet between Ian Read (musician) and Ysanne Spevack in 2000, distributed by Tesco in Germany, and pressed up on blue vinyl with a letterpress gatefold cover under the band name Fire + Ice.
 The folk-rock group Steeleye Span recorded a version on their 2009 album Cogs, Wheels and Lovers.
 Electro noir artist Alien Skin, formerly with Real Life (of '80s "Send Me An Angel" fame), recorded his version on the 2010 album The Unquiet Grave.
 Orcadian singer Kris Drever recorded a version of this song to music of his own on Lau's album Lightweights and Gentlemen in 2009. 
 The eleven-piece folk band Bellowhead recorded a cover of Ween's version ("Cold Blows the Wind") for their album, Hedonism in 2010.
 Electronic arrangement by Vladislav Korolev, sung by Lori Joachim Fredrics and premiered on April 13, 2013
 The German electronica/darkwave band Helium Vola included a rendition on their 2013 album, Wohin?.
 British folk singer/songwriter Elliott Morris included an arrangement of "Unquiet Grave" on his 2013 EP, Shadows and Whispers.
 British medieval folk-rock band Gryphon recorded their interpretation of the ballad using the Dives and Lazarus melody on their 1973 debut album  Gryphon
 English progressive rock musician Steven Wilson recorded an arrangement of the song. It was the B-Side to "Cover version IV", one of a series of six singles, each consisting of a cover of a song written by another artist as the A-side, with the B-sides consisting of original songs (with the exception of "The Unquiet Grave"). The six cover versions and corresponding B-sides were released together on a compilation album, Cover Version, in 2014.
 Part of the song was performed by Helen McCrory in the Penny Dreadful episode "Fresh Hell", and again by Sarah Greene in "And They Were Enemies".
 The Ghosts of Johnson City recorded a version of the song for their 2015 album Am I Born To Die?
 Daoirí Farrell recorded a version of the song on his 2016 album "True Born Irishman"
Joan Baez sings it on 3 albums
 on the album Joan Baez/5 (1964)
 on the compilation album The Joan Baez Lovesong Album (1976)
 on the live album Live at Newport (1996)
 House and Land interpret the song as their final track on their self-titled 2017 album.
 The English folk duo The Askew Sisters recorded the ballad on their 2014 album In the Air or the Earth.
 The Spanish dark pagan folk band Trobar de Morte recorded a version of the song on their eighth studio album The Book of Shadows in 2020.
 Irish singers Pauline Scanlon and Damien Dempsey performed a six and a half minute duet on Scanlon's 2022 album, The Unquiet.
 Canadian Celtic/Polka Punk Band "The Dreadnoughts" released their version of this tune, entitled "The Unquiet Grave" on March 14th 2023. Offering a haunting, gritty take on this classic.

References

External links

Variants and images of old broadsides can be found at Joe Offer's copy of the folkinfo archive.

Child Ballads
Fictional ghosts
Joan Baez songs
Jean Ritchie songs
Year of song unknown